Samuel Shepherd Caldwell (November 4, 1892 – August 14, 1953), was a Louisiana oilman and politician who served as mayor of Shreveport, Louisiana, from 1934 to 1946.

Caldwell was an unusually staunch segregationist even for the era in the Deep South. In 1943, Caldwell chose to turn down $67,000 in federal funds for a new medical center because it would have required hiring 12 blacks out of every 100 workers. (Shreveport was 37% African American in the 1940 census.) "We are not going to be bribed by federal funds," Caldwell explained, "to accept the negro as our political or social equal"; federal officials would not "cram the negro down our throats."

References

1892 births
1953 deaths
People from Mooringsport, Louisiana
American Presbyterians
Louisiana Democrats
Businesspeople from Louisiana
Mayors of Shreveport, Louisiana
Parish jurors and commissioners in Louisiana
Louisiana Tech University alumni
Deaths from lung disease
Burials in Louisiana
20th-century American politicians
20th-century American businesspeople